Pleading the belly was a process available at English common law, which permitted a woman in the later stages of pregnancy to receive a reprieve of her death sentence until after she bore her child. The plea was available at least as early as 1387 and was eventually rendered obsolete by the Sentence of Death (Expectant Mothers) Act 1931, which stated that an expecting mother would automatically have her death sentence commuted to life imprisonment with hard labour.

The plea did not constitute a defence, and could only be made after a verdict of guilty was delivered. Upon making the plea, the convict was entitled to be examined by a jury of matrons, generally selected from the observers present at the trial. If she was found to be pregnant with a quick child (that is, a foetus sufficiently developed to render its movement detectable) the convict was granted a reprieve of sentence until the next hanging time after her delivery.
  
Scholarly reviews of the Old Bailey Sessions Papers and Assize records from the reigns of Elizabeth I and James I have shown that women granted such reprieves were often subsequently granted pardons or had their sentences commuted to transportation. Even those women who were subsequently executed pursuant to their original sentences were often executed behind schedule.

The famous female pirates Anne Bonny and Mary Read both used this plea to delay execution, although Read died of fever in prison.

It appears that women were often fraudulently or erroneously found to be quick with child. Daniel Defoe's Moll Flanders includes a character who successfully pleaded her belly despite being "no more with child than the judge that tried [her]". John Gay's The Beggar's Opera includes a scene where the character Filch picks up income working as a "child getter ... helping the ladies to a pregnancy against their being called down to sentence".

As a check against this abuse of the system, the law held that no women could be granted a second reprieve from the original sentence on the ground of subsequent pregnancy, even if the foetus had quickened. In the event that a female prisoner became pregnant, her gaoler or the local sheriff was subject to a fine.

References

English criminal law
Legal issues in pregnancy
Capital punishment